Lambert Brown is a member of the Senate of Jamaica from the People's National Party. He is a member of the Shadow Cabinet of Jamaica.

Political views 
Brown is an advocate for a higher minimum wage.

References 

Living people
21st-century Jamaican politicians
People's National Party (Jamaica) politicians
Members of the Senate of Jamaica
Year of birth missing (living people)